Messing may refer to:
 Messing, Essex, a village in Essex, England
 Messing (surname)

See also 
 Messing Around (disambiguation)